Bala Mahalleh-ye Chukam (also Romanized as Bālā Maḩalleh-ye Chūkām; also known as Bāzār Chowgām, Bāzār Chowkām, Bāzār Chūkām, Chokam, Chowkām, Chūkām, and Chyukam) is a city and the center of Chukam District in Khomam County, Gilan Province, Iran. At the 2006 census, its population was 2,869, in 793 families.

References 

Populated places in Rasht County